Nevadella is an extinct genus of trilobites, fossil marine arthropods, with species of average size (about  long). It lived during the late Atdabanian stage, which lasted from 530 to 524 million years ago during the early part of the Cambrian Period.

Etymology 
The name is derived from Nevadia, a related genus.

Taxonomy 
Nevadia predates Nevadella and may include its direct ancestor.

Species previously assigned to Nevadella 
 N. burri = Pleisionevadella burri

Description 
The body of Nevadella is very flat dorso-ventrally. The general outline of its thin, lightly calcified exoskeleton is inverted drop-shaped. The front is rounded, widest at the back of the headshield (or cephalon), and tapering from there to an eventually rounded termination. The central area of the cephalon (or glabella) is distinctly tapered forward, sides slightly concave, but wedging out slightly in the frontal half and with a rounded front (like the silhouette of a slim pawn). The glabella and the frontal margin almost or entirely touch (in jargon: the preglabellar field is short or absent). Cephalic margin at least as wide as the most frontal thoracal segment. The thorax has 17 to 23 segments, gradually diminishing in size. The pleural spines are long and sickle-shaped. The tailshield (or pygidium) is very small and subquadrate in shape.

Distribution 
Fossils of Nevadella have been found in the late Atdabanian of the USA (California, Nevada) and Canada (Cordilleran region).
 N. eucharis is known from the Middle Member of the Poleta Formation, Esmeralda County, Nevada, USA.
 N. keelensis is known from the Sekwi Formation, Northwest Territories, Canada.
 N. mountjoyi is known from the Mural Formation, north slope of Mount Mumm, Alberta, Canada.
 N. perfecta is known from the Mahto Formation, Mumm Peak on the west side of Hitka Pass, western Alberta, Canada.

Ecology 
Contemporary taxa that also occur in the so-called "Nevadella" Zone include Esmeraldina, Holmiella, Palmettaspis, Bradyfallotaspis, Geraldinella, Paranevadella, Nevadia, Buenellus, and Cirquella.

Habitat 
Nevadella species were probably marine bottom dwellers, like all Olenellina.

References 

Redlichioidea
Cambrian trilobites of North America
Paleozoic life of Alberta
Paleozoic life of British Columbia
Cambrian genus extinctions